Craig Farmstead is a historic home and farm located near Gastonia, Gaston County, North Carolina.  The William Moore Craig House was built about 1852, and is a one-story, single pile, two-room hewn- and sawn-frame house. The William Newton Craig House was built in 1886, and is a two-story, single pile Italianate style frame dwelling.  Also on the property are the contributing privy (c. 1900-1910), meat / well house (c. 1900-1910), frame barn (c. 1890-1910), rectangular log pen barn (c. 1852-1860), and corn crib (c. 1900-1910).

It was listed on the National Register of Historic Places in 2006.

References

Farms on the National Register of Historic Places in North Carolina
Italianate architecture in North Carolina
Houses completed in 1852
Houses in Gaston County, North Carolina
National Register of Historic Places in Gaston County, North Carolina
1852 establishments in North Carolina